Chauliodus eximus, originally described in 1925 as Eostomias eximus, is an extinct viperfish in the family Stomiidae from marine Late Miocene-aged strata of Southern California.

See also
 Viperfish

References

Chauliodus
Fish of the Pacific Ocean
Miocene fish of North America
Fossil taxa described in 1925